Turkov, Turkow, Turkova or Turkovs may refer to
Places
Turków, a village in south-western Poland
Turkova Draga, an abandoned village in southern Slovenia

Surname
Jonas Turkow (1898–1987), Polish actor, stage manager, director and writer
Valentina Turkova, Soviet rower
Daniils Turkovs (born 1988), Latvian footballer
Tatyana Turkova (born 1988), Kazakhstani athlete